Atlas is an unincorporated community which lies at the intersection of US Route 54 and Illinois Route 96 in western Pike County, Illinois. The community of Rockport lies about 2.5 miles to the northwest along route 96. The city of Louisiana, Missouri lies about six miles to the southwest across the Mississippi River.

References

Unincorporated communities in Pike County, Illinois
Unincorporated communities in Illinois